{{Infobox television
| image              = ITV From the Heart.png
| caption            =
| picture_format     = 
| genre              = Charity
| runtime            = 
| creator            = ITV Studios
| developer          = 
| director           = 
| creative_director  = 
| country            = United Kingdom
| presenter          = Dermot O'Leary
| starring           = 
| network            = ITV
| first_aired        = 
| num_series         = 
| num_episodes       = 
| executive_producer = 
| producer           = 
| composer           = 
| company            = ITV Studios
| distributor        = 
| location           = The London Studios
| related            = Text Santa,ITV Telethon
}}From the Heart is a campaign initiative set up in 2013 by ITV to raise awareness for organ donations. The campaign took place between 11 and 15 February 2013. ITV shows including Daybreak, This Morning and ITV News. On 24 July 2014, ITV confirmed that the telethon had been axed and would not be produced again.

2013 campaign
Tonight special

On Wednesday 13 February, an evening of awareness took place on ITV.
From 8pm, an hour-long episode of Tonight, presented by Jonathan Maitland aired, highlighting the need for organ donations.

Entertainment special
At 9pm, an hour-long entertainment special entitled From the Heart'', presented by Dermot O'Leary aired, starring the likes of Rowan Atkinson, Hugh Laurie, Pixie Lott, Alexandra Burke and McFly.

References

2013 British television series debuts
2013 British television series endings
British telethons
Health charities in the United Kingdom
ITV (TV network) original programming
Television series by ITV Studios
Television articles with incorrect naming style